Chamberlinius  is a genus of flat-backed millipedes in the family Paradoxosomatidae. There are five species; 3 of which occur only Taiwan, one only in the Ryukyu Islands of southeast Japan, and one occurring in both areas.

Species

References

Polydesmida
Millipedes of Asia